Battagram is a town and union council of Charsadda District in Khyber Pakhtunkhwa province of Pakistan. It is located at 34°13'7N 71°37'33E and at an altitude of 300 meters (987 feet). The town borders the village of Kharaki.

References

Union councils of Charsadda District
Populated places in Charsadda District, Pakistan
Villages in Pakistan